Bharath Reddy is an Indian actor who appears in Telugu and Tamil language films. A cardiologist by profession, Reddy made a breakthrough portraying a police officer in Chakri Toleti's Telugu–Tamil bilingual film Eenadu / Unnaipol Oruvan (2009).

Career
Bharath Reddy was born in Chandragiri, a suburb of Tirupathi, Andhra Pradesh. He was brought up in Chennai, completing his schooling from La Chateline Residential Junior College. He completed his medical degree from Yerevan State Medical University, in Armenia, and then went on to complete his diploma in Cardiology. He started working as a Junior Consulting Cardiologist at Apollo Hospitals, Elbit Medical Diagnostics, and Century Hospital in Hyderabad.

He did close to a dozen films in walk-in roles and in characters as a villain's henchman, before being noticed for his work in J. D. Chakravarthy's Siddham (2009). After being impressed by his performance in that film, Chakri Toleti selected him to play a police officer in his bilingual film Unnaipol Oruvan, where Bharath was able to act with veteran actors Kamal Haasan, Mohanlal and Venkatesh. Since then he has appeared in notable Telugu films including the Nagarjuna-starrers Ragada and Greeku Veerudu, as well as playing a role in Mahesh Babu's Businessman. He has also worked in Tamil films including as a police officer in Radha Mohan's Payanam, Ragalaipuram and most recently, Idhu Kathirvelan Kadhal as Udhayanidhi Stalin's brother-in-law.

Filmography

References

External links

Indian male film actors
Male actors in Tamil cinema
Living people
Male actors in Telugu cinema
People from Tirupati
Yerevan State Medical University alumni
Male actors from Chennai
21st-century Indian male actors
Male actors from Andhra Pradesh
Telugu male actors
1978 births